The 2020–21 Championnat National season was the 28th season since the establishment of the Championnat National, and the 22nd in its current format, which serves as the third division of the French football league system.

Team changes 
Team changes from the 2019–20 Championnat National were confirmed by the FFF on 17 July 2020.

To National
Promoted from National 2
SC Bastia
Stade Briochin
Sète
Annecy

Relegated from Ligue 2
Orléans
Le Mans

From National
Relegated to National 2
Le Puy
Toulon
Gazélec Ajaccio
Béziers

Promoted to Ligue 2
Pau
Dunkerque

Stadia and locations

Number of teams by regions

Impact of COVID-19 on the season
The start of the season was impacted by the ongoing COVID-19 situation. The game-week two match between Bourg-Péronnas and Annecy was postponed due to the visiting team having confirmed cases of COVID-19. Game-week three matches between Annecy and Villefranche, and Quevilly-Rouen and Bourg-Péronnas were both postponed due to COVID-19 cases at Annecy and Bourg-Péronnas, as was the match between Bourg-Péronnas and Red Star in game-week four, due to Bourg-Péronnas players still isolating. The game-week four match between Concarneau and Cholet was postponed an hour before kick-off due to positive tests for the Concarneau trainer and captain. There was a follow-on postponement for Concarneau's match with Annecy in game-week 5, Annecy's third postponement of the season.

The game-week four and five matches for Orléans, against Avranches and Stade Briochin, were both postponed when Orléans were given an eight-day suspension from official matches due to positive COVID-19 cases. The cases at Orléans also prompted the late postponement of the game-week 4 match between Bastia-Borgo and Boulogne, in accordance with local Corsican rules, due to Bastia-Borgo having played Orléans the previous Thursday.

Positive cases at Sète caused the postponement of their game-week 5 match at Quevilly-Rouen, and their game-week 6 match against Red Star, whilst a local decree in Haute-Corse caused the postponement of their game-week 7 tie at SC Bastia.

Laval's trip to SC Bastia in game-week 9 was postponed due to the squad isolating after a positive diagnosis. Further positive tests caused the cancellation of Laval's game-week 10 match against Boulogne. The match between SC Lyon and Cholet in the same round was postponed due to positive cases at Cholet.

Game-week 11 saw the postponements of Annecy v SC Lyon, Quevilly-Rouen v Stade Briochin and Villefranche v Sète were postponed due to Covid cases.

Four matches rearranged for the catch-up week of 28 to 30 October; Quevilly-Rouen v Bourg-Péronnas, Sète v Red Star, Annecy v Villefranche and SC Lyon v Cholet, were postponed for a second time due to Covid cases.

Game-week 12 ties between Cholet and Annecy, SC Lyon and Quevilly-Rouen, and Orléans and Boulogne were postponed. Game-week 13 ties between Boulogne and Avranches, and between Le Mans and Orléans were postponed.

All of the postponed matches were caught up by 15 December 2020.

In February 2021, Red Star had two matches postponed due to Covid cases.

In March 2021, the games between Laval and Bastia, and Concarneau and Boulogne, scheduled for 13 March, were both postponed due to Covid cases in the Laval and Boulogne squads. Boulogne's next scheduled match, against Laval, was also postponed. Positive cases at Créteil caused the postponement of their matches with Boulogne (27 March) and Le Mans (2 April). The rescheduled date for Créteil's match with Le Mans, 14 April, was also postponed, along with their match against Villefranche, scheduled for 17 April, as the outbreak continued.

In April, the game between Orléans and Le Mans, scheduled for 9 April, was postponed due to Covid cases in the Orléans squad. On 21 April, Orléans announced further postponements due to Covid cases: the game against Le Mans, which had been rearranged for 21 April, and the game against Villefranche, which was scheduled for 24 April. The game between Cholet and Bastia, scheduled for 23 April, was postponed on 22 April.

League table
Due to the 2020–21 Championnat National 2 season being declared void, the normal relegation rules did not fully apply, as there was no balancing promotion from that division. However, the regulations of the Championnat National state that the team classified in last position is relegated without the possibility of repechage. On 13 July 2021 the FFF Comex (executive committee) confirmed the relegation of SC Lyon.

Promotion play-offs
A promotion play-off was held at the end of the season between the 18th-placed team of the 2020–21 Ligue 2 and the 3rd-placed team of the 2020–21 Championnat National. This was played over two legs on 19 and 22 May.

Niort won 3–3 on away goals

Top scorers

References

Championnat National seasons
3
France